is a railway station on the Hakodate Main Line in Kutchan, Hokkaido, Japan. It is operated by JR Hokkaido and has the station number "S23".

Lines
Both local and the Rapid  services stop at the station.
When the Hokkaido Shinkansen opens in the spring of 2031, the Hakodate Main Line will be truncated and the section of track between Oshamabe Station and Otaru Station will be abolished. This will leave Kutchan Station with no conventional line and only the Shinkansen will serve it.

Station layout

Platforms

History
After the Hokkaido Railway was nationalized on 1 July 1907, Japanese Government Railways (JGR) took over control of the station. On 12 October 1909 the station became part of the Hakodate Main Line. With the privatization of Japanese National Railways (JNR), the successor of JGR, control of the station passed to JR Hokkaido.

The  served Kutchan from Date's Monbetsu Station of the Muroran Line, but it was discontinued in 1986. A curve, where the track has now been lifted from, can still clearly be seen north of Kutchan Station from satellite imagery.

Surrounding area
 Kutchan town office

See also
 List of railway stations in Japan

References

Railway stations in Hokkaido Prefecture
Railway stations in Japan opened in 1904
Hokkaido Shinkansen